Klaus Berger (25 November 1940 – 8 June 2020) was a German academic theologian. Berger was Professor of New Testament Theology at the University of Heidelberg.

Biography
He is known for his study and publications on the New Testament. He had been quoted in several Catholic news sources to the effect that he was Catholic or somehow "both Catholic and Protestant." This idea was rejected by the Roman Catholic Church and, after this controversy, he left the Protestant Church in Baden and became a member once more of the Roman Catholic Church (in the diocese of Hildesheim, Germany).

Personal life
Berger had two children from his first marriage with Christa Berger. Later he married translation scholar Christiane Nord. He was a familiaris of the Cistercian Abbey of Heiligenkreuz in the Vienna Woods.

Selected works

Books

 - pub. in German by Verl. Kath. Bibelwerk, 1995

Edited by

References

1940 births
2020 deaths
German Christian theologians
New Testament scholars
German biblical scholars
20th-century German theologians
Academic staff of Heidelberg University
German male non-fiction writers
20th-century Christian biblical scholars
Roman Catholic biblical scholars